The lutino peach-faced love bird (Agapornis roseicollis) is one of the most popular mutations of rosy-faced lovebird. It is closely followed by the Dutch blue lovebird in popularity.

See also
Rosy-faced lovebird
Rosy-faced lovebird colour genetics
Lutino cockatiel mutation

References

External links
Simple Peach-faced Lovebird Genetics

Aviculture
Vertebrate genetics
Lovebirds
Rosy-faced lovebird colour mutations